North Oklahoma Botanical Garden and Arboretum is a botanical garden and arboretum on the campus of Northern Oklahoma College, located at 1220 East Grand Avenue, Tonkawa, Oklahoma. It is an affiliate garden of the Oklahoma Botanical Garden and Arboretum and open to the public daily without charge.

The gardens were established in 1901 with the college's foundation, and were a top priority of the college's third president, Lynn Glover (1911-1916). Today's gardens include an arboretum and butterfly, display, herb, perennial, rose, and sensory gardens. In February 1993 a Quonset greenhouse (2016 square feet) was added, with a 7,500 plant capacity for growing annual bedding plants. Since that time, 4,000 to 6,000 annual bedding plants have been planted each spring. In 1995 a mass planting of 150 redbuds marked the first annual Redbud Festival. Recently at least one new specimen tree has been added to the campus annually.

External links
North Oklahoma Botanical Garden and Arboretum

See also 
 List of botanical gardens and arboretums in Oklahoma

Arboreta in Oklahoma
Botanical gardens in Oklahoma
Protected areas of Kay County, Oklahoma